Nikos Paragios (born at 1972) is a professor of Computer Science and Applied mathematics at CentraleSupélec, senior fellow at the Institut Universitaire de France and affiliated scientific leader at Inria while serving as the editor in chief of the Computer Vision and Image Understanding Journal of Elsevier Publishing House.
He holds a D.Sc. degree in electrical and computer engineering (2000) from Inria and the University of Nice Sophia Antipolis, and has held permanent positions at Siemens Corporate Technology, École des ponts ParisTech as well as visiting positions at Rutgers University, Yale University and University of Houston.

Work
 medical imaging, computer vision, Image processing and machine learning

Awards
 IEEE Fellow for his contributions to continuous and discrete inference in computer vision, 2011
 Bodossaki Foundation Scientific Award in applied and engineering sciences, 2008 
 Francois Erbsmann Prize (with Ben Glocker), Information Processing in Medical Imaging (IPMI), 2007
 TR35 MIT Technology Review Award, 2006
 Cor Baayen ERCIM  Award (honorable mention), 2000

Books
 "Geometric Level Set Methods in Imaging, Vision and Graphics" (with Stanley Osher) published in 2003 by Springer
 "Handbook of Mathematical Models in Computer Vision" (with Yunmei Chen and Olivier Faugeras) published in 2005 by Springer
 "Handbook of Biomedical Imaging: Methodologies and Clinical Research" (with James Duncan and Nicholas Ayache) published by Springer in 2015.

External links
Nikos Paragios Homepage
Google Scholar Profile

Living people
Greek computer scientists
Computer vision researchers
University of Crete alumni
Fellow Members of the IEEE
Year of birth missing (living people)
People from Rhodes